Vistas is the plural of vista and may refer to:

Vels Institute of Science, Technology & Advanced Studies, Chennai, Tamil Nadu, India
Vistas High School Program, an alternative public high school program based in unincorporated Harris County, Texas, United States
Victoria Vistas, a former Canadian soccer club
Vistas (band), a Scottish alternative, indie rock band

See also
 
 Vista (disambiguation)